The Sikorsky S-70 is an American medium transport/utility helicopter family manufactured by Sikorsky Aircraft. It was developed for the United States Army in the 1970s, winning a competition to be designated the UH-60 Black Hawk and spawning a large family in U.S. military service.  New and improved versions of the UH-60 have been developed since.  Civilian versions, and some military versions, are produced under various S-70 model designations.

Development
The S-70 family was developed to meet a United States Army requirement to replace the UH-1 Iroquois family of utility medium-lift helicopters in 1972. Three YUH-60A prototypes were constructed, with the first flying in October 1974. They were evaluated against the Boeing-Vertol YUH-61A. The YUH-60A was selected for production, and entered service as the UH-60A Black Hawk with the U.S. Army in 1979.

After entering service, the helicopter was modified for new missions and roles, including mine laying and medical evacuation.  An EH-60 variant was developed to conduct electronic warfare and special operations aviation developed the MH-60 variant to support its missions. In the late 1980s the model was upgraded to the UH-60L, which featured more power and lift with the upgrade to the -701C model of the GE T700 engine.  The improved UH-60M model was developed in the early 2000s. The UH-60M and its International version, the S-70i, include GPS navigation, a glass cockpit, an integrated Flight Management System, and a significant upgrade to the powertrain and rotor system adding both power and lift capability.

The S-70 can perform a variety of missions, including air cavalry, electronic warfare, and aeromedical evacuation. Versions are used to transport the President of the United States under call sign "Marine One". In air assault operations it can move a squad of 11 combat troops and equipment or carry the 105 mm M102 howitzer, thirty rounds of ammunition, and a six-man crew. Alternatively, it can carry  of cargo or sling load  of cargo. The S-70 is equipped with advanced avionics and electronics, such as the Global Positioning System.

The United States Navy received the first navalized SH-60B Seahawk in 1983, and the SH-60F Ocean Hawk in 1988.

The HH-60G Pave Hawk is a highly modified version of the S-70 primarily designed to recover downed aircrew or other isolated personnel during war and equipped with a rescue hoist with a  cable that has a  lift capability, and a retractable in-flight refueling probe. The United States Air Force received the MH-60G Pave Hawk in 1982.

The United States Coast Guard received the HH-60J Jayhawk in 1992. It utilizes the equipment of the HH-60G Pave Hawk on the navalized SH-60 platform.

The S-70A Firehawk is a version of the S-70 designed for firefighting, rescue, medical evacuation, and external lift of bulky cargo and equipment. The Oregon National Guard was the first military organization in the world to add the Firehawk to its inventory; the Los Angeles County Fire Department was the first municipal organization.   Another Firehawk aerial firefighting operator is the California Department of Forestry and Fire Protection (CAL FIRE) with the S-70i variant.

The Army flies medical evacuation models configured as rotary winged medical suites. It also uses the S-70 for special operations by the 160th Special Operations Aviation Regiment ("Night Stalkers") at Fort Campbell, Kentucky, designated as the MH-60K.

The Maple Hawk was a variant offered by Sikorsky to the Canadian Forces during a 1996 tender to replace the military's search and rescue helicopters.

Operational history

Colombia
In 2010 August 5, to support its counter-narcotics and armed forces modernisation efforts, the US DSCA approved the Colombian Govt's request of additional 9 UH-60L (4 units allocated to the national police force).

In 2017 March, the National Police of Colombia ordered 10 additional 2nd-hand UH-60A helicopters that will increase their total to 19 helicopters in operation.

Variants

H-60
 AH-60 Arpia III: Based on the UH-60H platform, is an indigenous development made by the Colombian Air Force, Israel Aircraft Industries (IAI) (Elbit Systems), and Sikorsky Aircraft. Main armament is Hellfire anti-tank missiles and a GAU-21 machine gun on an indigenously developed turret.
 AH-60 Arpia IV: Based on the UH-60L, is an indigenous development made by the Colombian Air Force, IAI (Elbit Systems), and Sikorsky. Main armament is the Spike NLOS and a Nexter THL-20 gun turret.
 UH-60 Black Hawk: The basic military utility helicopter for the U.S. Army, with MH-60A, K, L, and M Special Operations variants. 
 VH-60 White Hawk: The U.S. presidential transport helicopter, Marine One, used by the United States Marine Corps Marine Helicopter Squadron One
 SH-60 Seahawk: Variant for anti-submarine warfare, search and rescue, maritime patrol, all-weather and day/night for the U.S. Navy.
Sikorsky MH-60R Seahawk: A multimission maritime helicopter for the U.S. Navy
Sikorsky MH-60S, unofficially known as the "Knighthawk", maritime medium-heavy lift helicopter for the U.S. Navy
 HH-60 Pave Hawk: Heli-rescue variant for search and rescue, MEDEVAC, and combat search and rescue use on day and night operations for the USAF.
 MH-60G Pave Hawk, Special Operations search-and-rescue helicopter variant for the U.S. Air Force.
 HH-60 Jayhawk: Variant for maritime patrol, interdiction, and search and rescue for the United States Coast Guard.  The MH-60T Jayhawk is an upgraded version.

S-70
The company name for the H-60/S-70 family is the S-70 Black Hawk.
 S-70A Black Hawk (UH-60 Black Hawk): Military model for the export market.
 S-70A Firehawk: Firefighting variant of the UH-60L. Tank system designed and built by Aero Union in Chico, California.
 S-70A (N) Naval Hawk: Maritime variant that blends the S-70A Black Hawk and S-70B Seahawk designs.
 S-70B/C Seahawk: Maritime military model for the export market.
 S-70A-9: Australian derivative Black Hawk
 S-70C Firehawk: Civilian water-bomber variant
 S-70i Black Hawk: International military version assembled by Sikorsky subsidiary, PZL Mielec in Poland.
 Turkish Aerospace Industries T-70: A Turkish variant of the S-70i, built under license by Turkish Aerospace Industries with indigenous Turkish mission-computer and avionics (by ASELSAN); flight controls, landing gear and transmission (by Alp Aviation); and T700-TEI-701D engines under license from General Electric (by Tusaş Engine Industries). Turkey was to initially produce about 109 T70s under license. U.S. Ambassador to Turkey Frank Ricciardone stated that Turkey intends to produce some 600 T70s.
S-70M Black Hawk: FAA type certified (Restricted Category Special Airworthiness Certificate) version based on S70i Black Hawk manufactured by Sikorsky subsidiary, PZL Mielec in Poland. S-70M Black Hawk helicopter is available to the US commercial/civil market for the missions such as agricultural operations, external cargo carriage and forest and wildlife conservation, which includes aerial firefighting missions

Derivatives
 Sikorsky S-71 - a proposed attack helicopter using dynamic components from the S-70.
 Sikorsky S-92 - Civilian medium-lift derivative of the S-70/H-60 with dynamic components based on S-70/H-60 components.  The S-92 took its maiden flight on December 23, 1998 at the Sikorsky Development Flight Center, West Palm Beach, Florida.
 H-92 Superhawk - military version of the S-92.  The Sikorsky CH-148 Cyclone is the H-92 version for the Canadian Armed Forces.
Sikorsky VH-92 - VIP transport version of the S-92.

Civilian operators

 
Presidential Air Group

 Colombian National Police UH-60L [(11) (2 lost)] UH-60A (10) (19 total)

Indonesian National Board for Disaster Management Authority - Leased from Timberline Helicopters, Inc.

Federal Police
 Jalisco State Police

 Police S-70i (3) (2 on order)

 Ministry of Internal Affairs - S-70M (6 on order, up to 12 to be purchased). Intended to be used by SMURD.

 Ministry of Interior

 General Directorate of Security

California Department of Forestry and Fire Protection (CAL FIRE)
 Los Angeles County Fire Department
San Diego Fire-Rescue Department
 U.S. Customs and Border Protection
Ventura County Sheriffs Department
Ukraine

 Main Directorate of Intelligence — S-70i BLACK HAWK (2)

Specifications (S-70i)

See also

References

Notes

Bibliography

External links 

 S-70 Black Hawk family page at Sikorsky.com 
 S-70 Seahawk family page at Sikorsky.com 
 S-70i page at Sikorsky.com 
 Sikorsky UH-60/S-70 Black Hawk Family page on centennialofflight.net
 Firehawk, Inc web site
 HELIS.com Sikorsky S-70/H-70 Hawk Family Database
 S-70i Black Hawk multirole combat helicopter(Air recognition)

 
1970s United States helicopters
Search and rescue helicopters
S-070
1970s United States military utility aircraft
1970s United States civil utility aircraft
Twin-turbine helicopters
Aircraft first flown in 1974